Amanita volvata, also known as volvate amanita is an inedible white-coloured species of fungi from the family Amanitaceae found in the southeastern United States. Can be confused with Amanita ponderosa, but that species is from the Iberian peninsula. The species is amyloid and have saccate volva, and elliptic spores.

See also

List of Amanita species

References

External links
Photo of Amanita volvata on Flickr
Photos of Amanita volvata
Photo of Amanita volvata on David Work Mushroom Photography
Detailed photos of Amanita volvata anatomy

volvata
Fungi of the United States
Ecology of the Appalachian Mountains
Taxa named by Charles Horton Peck
Fungi without expected TNC conservation status